Al Qahera Al Youm (English: Cairo Today) is an Egyptian live television talk show that broadcasts nearly throughout the year from the 6th of October studios located in Cairo. Al Qahera Al-Youm is one of the most popular and influential shows in the Middle East with millions of viewers world wide. Hosted by Gamal Enaiet with Mariam Zaki and others. The program efficiently covers all aspects of life in Egypt from  politics, to arts, sports, cultural and economic issues, and even international affairs. It airs on Al Yawm channel which is produced by Mediagates part of Orbit Communications Company now known as the OSN. The Show currently broadcasts throughout the week, from Sunday to Thursday.

References

External links 
 Al Qahera Al Your at OSN Alfa
 Al Qahera Al Youm on Facebook

Egyptian television talk shows
Mass media in Cairo